Charopella is a genus of two species of tiny pinwheel snails that are endemic to Australia's Lord Howe Island in the Tasman Sea.

Species
 Charopella wilkinsoni (Brazier, 1889) – Wilkinson's pinwheel snail
 Charopella zela Iredale, 1944 – Mount Gower banded pinwheel snail

References

 
Taxa named by Tom Iredale
Gastropod genera
Gastropods of Lord Howe Island